Hohenstaufen most commonly refers to the House of Hohenstaufen, a dynasty of the Holy Roman Empire.

Hohenstaufen may also refer to:

 Hohenstaufen Castle, the castle that served as the seat of the dynasty
 Hohenstaufen (mountain), the mountain upon which the castle is built
 9. SS Panzer-Division Hohenstaufen, a German Waffen-SS Armoured division during World War II